A Cook's Tour: In Search of the Perfect Meal, sometimes later published as A Cook's Tour: Global Adventures in Extreme Cuisines, is a New York Times bestselling book written by chef and author Anthony Bourdain in 2001. It is Bourdain's account of his world travels – eating exotic local dishes and experiencing life as a native in each country.  The book was simultaneously made into a television series featuring Bourdain for the Food Network.

Locations
Bourdain's travels included Portugal, France, Vietnam, Russia, Morocco, Japan, Cambodia, Mexico, Spain, and French Laundry in Napa Valley.

Foods
He tries such exotic dishes as pufferfish, still beating cobra heart, "lobster blood" (a mix of lobster sexual organs and vodka), and soft-boiled balut - duck embryo with half-formed bones and feathers.

Award
The book was named 2002 Food Book of the Year by the British Guild of Food Writers.

Title
The title is derived from "Cook's Tour", a British idiomatic phrase meaning a brief or cursory guide to a subject or place. Its origin is in the trips organized by Thomas Cook in the 19th century.

Quotes
In regard to Henry Kissinger he wrote: “Once you’ve been to Cambodia, you’ll never stop wanting to beat Henry Kissinger to death with your bare hands. You will never again be able to open a newspaper and read about that treacherous, prevaricating, murderous scumbag sitting down for a nice chat with Charlie Rose or attending some black-tie affair for a new glossy magazine without choking. Witness what Henry did in Cambodia – the fruits of his genius for statesmanship – and you will never understand why he’s not sitting in the dock at The Hague next to Milošević.”

References

External links 
 New York Times review
 A Cook's Tour (Chapter 1)

Books about food and drink
2001 non-fiction books
American travel books
Bloomsbury Publishing books